, better known by his stage name  is a Japanese actor, voice actor and narrator who is affiliated with Office Osawa. After graduating from Toyo University, he often plays middle-aged or older characters in anime.

Filmography

Television

Films

Video games

Dubbing

References

External links
  
 
 
 Chafurin at Ryu's Seiyuu Infos
 

1961 births
Living people
Japanese male stage actors
Japanese male video game actors
Japanese male voice actors
Male voice actors from Saitama Prefecture
Toyo University alumni